KURA-LP (98.9 FM) is a radio station licensed to Ouray, Colorado, United States.  The station is currently owned by Ouray School District R1.

References

External links
 

URA-LP
URA-LP